A comprador or compradore is a "person who acts as an agent for foreign organizations engaged in investment, trade, or economic or political exploitation". An example of a comprador would be a native manager for a European business house in East and South East Asia, and, by extension, social groups that play broadly similar roles in other parts of the world.

Etymology
The term comprador, a Portuguese word that means buyer, derives from the Latin comparare, which means to procure. The original usage of the word in East Asia meant a native servant in European households in Guangzhou in southern China or the neighboring Portuguese colony at Macao that went to market to barter their employers' wares. The term then evolved to mean the native contract suppliers who worked for foreign companies in East Asia or the native managers of firms in East Asia. Compradors held important positions in southern China buying and selling tea, silk, cotton and yarn for foreign corporations and working in foreign-owned banks. Robert Hotung, a late-nineteenth-century compradore of the trading conglomerate Jardine, Matheson & Co. was believed to be the richest man in Hong Kong by the age of 35. Li & Fung partly functioned as a Canton comprador in its early stages.

In Marxism, the term comprador bourgeoisie was later applied to similar trading-class in regions outside East Asia.

With the emergence or the re-emergence of globalization, the term "comprador" has reentered the lexicon to denote trading groups and classes in the developing world in subordinate but mutually-advantageous relationships with metropolitan capital. The Egyptian Marxist Samir Amin has discussed the role of compradors in the contemporary global economy in his recent work. In addition, the Indian economist Ashok Mitra has accused the owners and managers of firms attached to the Indian software industry of being compradors.<ref>Mitra, Ashok. [https://web.archive.org/web/20080106224741/http://www.telegraphindia.com/1070427/asp/opinion/story_7700976.asp " Hour of the Comprador]. The Telegraph, Kolkata, 27 April 2007.</ref> Growing identification of the software industry in India with comprador "qualities" has led to the labeling of certain persons associated with the industry as "dot.compradors."

In Marxist terminology, comprador bourgeoisie, perceived as the serving the interests of foreign imperial powers, is counterposed to national bourgeoisie which is considered as opposing foreign imperialism and promoting the independence of its own country and, as such, could be, under some circumstances, a short-term ally of socialist revolutionaries.

Notable compradors
China
Chang Kia-ngau (Shanghai)
Zheng Guanying
Tong King-sing (Guangdong)
Ho Tung (Hong Kong)

Bangladesh
Latifur Rahman

See also

 Factor (agent)
 List of trading companies
 Social structure of China
 Protégé system, Capitulations of the Ottoman Empire

References

Further reading

 Chan, Wellington K. K. "Government, merchants and industry to 1911." The Cambridge History of China: 1800-1911 vol 11. Part 2 (1980) pp: 416–462.
 Faure, David. China and Capitalism: A History of Business Enterprise in Modern China (Hong Kong UP, 2006), covers 1500 to 1999; 136pp
 Faure, David. The rural economy of pre-liberation China: trade expansion and peasant livelihood in Jiangsu and Guangdong, 1870 to 1937 (Oxford UP, 1989).
 Hao, Yen-p'ing. The comprador in nineteenth century China: bridge between East and West (Harvard UP. 1970) online.
 Hung, Ho-fung. "Agricultural Revolution and Elite Reproduction in Qing China: The Transition to Capitalism Debate Revisited" American Sociological Review (2008) 73#4 pp. 569–588 online
 Po-Keung, Hui. "Comprador politics and middleman capitalism." in Hong Kong's History, ed by Ngo Tak-wing (Routledge, 1999) pp: 30–45.
 Zelin, Madeleine. The Merchants of Zigong: Industrial Entrepreneurship in Early Modern China'' (Columbia UP, 2005).

External links

Business occupations
Economic history of China
Management occupations
Trading companies